Polakow is a surname. Notable people with the surname include:

Grzegorz Polakow (born 1935), Polish footballer and manager
Jason Polakow (born 1971), Australian windsurfer

See also
Sasha Polakow-Suransky (born 1979), American journalist and writer
Shael Polakow-Suransky (born 1972)